The Cimarron Mercantile, at 709 S. Collison St. in Cimarron, New Mexico, was listed on the National Register of Historic Places in 2019.

It is listed as a filming location by the New Mexico Film Office.

References

National Register of Historic Places in Colfax County, New Mexico
Buildings and structures in New Mexico